Max Beck (1966January 12, 2008) was an American intersex advocate, active in the now-defunct Intersex Society of North America (ISNA). Max participated in the first known public demonstration against human rights violations on intersex people, which took place in Boston on October 26, 1996. The event is now commemorated by Intersex Awareness Day.

Early life
Max Beck has described how his sex was not determinable at birth. Through testing it was discovered that he had mosaic XY/X0 chromosomes. His gonads were removed, and he was raised female, with yearly visits to endocrinologists and urologists. Beck's genitals were described as not yet "finished". Puberty "came in pill form", with a vaginoplasty, and he later attempted suicide. He survived and later met Tamara Alexander, later his wife, and subsequently switched hormone treatment to testosterone. The couple married on February 12, 2000. Alexander describes how the medical management of Beck's childhood is an "analogue for childhood sexual abuse", where disclosure and living were a blessing.

Activism
Beck has described how his activism began in 1996. In that year, he and Morgan Holmes acted as spokespersons for ISNA and participants in a demonstration outside the conference of the American Academy of Pediatrics on October 26, 1996 alongside allies from Transsexual Menace including Riki Wilchins. Holmes has written that the event was intended not as a demonstration but as participation in the conference. She states that the pair went to deliver an address, "on long-term outcomes and to challenging their still-prevailing opinion that cosmetic surgery to "fix" intersexed genitals was the best course of action", but were "met, officially, with hostility and were escorted out of the conference by security guards". Following the event, the Academy published a press release stating that "From the viewpoint of emotional development, 6 weeks to 15 months seems the optimal period for genital surgery."

Beck appears in the 2005 documentary Middle Sexes: Redefining He and She. The film was nominated for a 2006 GLAAD Media Award. Beck's wife, Tamara Beck, appears in the film Intersexion, recalling their relationship.

Death
Beck died of mullerian/vaginal cancer at age 42 in early 2008, leaving his wife Tamara and two children. In response to his death, Cheryl Chase stated that clinicians were unable to understand the "health issues of someone with his condition". Beck is remembered as an eloquent and patient advocate, an honest and powerful truthteller.

Selected bibliography

See also
Intersex human rights
Intersex Awareness Day

References

External links

Intersex men
Intersex rights activists
Intersex rights in the United States
1966 births
2008 deaths